The WWA World Women's Championship (Campeonato Mundial Femilin de WWA in Spanish) is an inactive professional wrestling women's professional wrestling championship promoted by the Mexican wrestling promotion World Wrestling Association (WWA). The title was created in 1989 but not very often defended, from 1991 to 2003 and 2003 to 2014 no record of any title defenses have been found, the title may have been inactive in those periods. Lady Apache is the current champion.

As it was a professional wrestling championship, the championship was not won not by actual competition, but by a scripted ending to a match determined by the bookers and match makers. On occasion the promotion declares a championship vacant, which means there is no champion at that point in time. This can either be due to a storyline, or real life issues such as a champion suffering an injury being unable to defend the championship, or leaving the company.

Title history

Footnotes

References

External links
World Wrestling Association World Women's Title

World Wrestling Association (Mexico) Championships
World professional wrestling championships
Women's professional wrestling championships